Rivina is a genus of flowering plants in the family Petiveriaceae. The name honors German botanist Augustus Quirinus Rivinus (1652-1723).

Selected species
 Rivina brasiliensis Nocca
 Rivina humilis L. – Pigeonberry (American tropics and subtropics)

Formerly placed here
 Trichostigma octandrum (L.) H.Walter (as R. octandra L.)

References

External links

Petiveriaceae
Caryophyllales genera